The geography and administrative subdivisions of Japan have evolved and changed during the course of its history.  These were sometimes grouped according to geographic position.

Kinai
Yamashiro
southern Kyoto
Yamato (northern Nara without Yoshino)
entire Nara
Yoshino (created from Yamato in 716, later rejoined back in 738)
southern Nara (Yoshino District + Gojō city)
Kawachi
eastern Osaka
Izumi (created in 716 from Kawachi, then rejoined back in 740, later re-split in 757)
southern/southwestern Osaka
Settsu
northeastern Hyōgo including Kōbe city
northern/northwestern Osaka including Osaka city

Tōkaidō
The Tōkaidō is a region; and its name literally means 'Eastern Sea Way'. The term also identifies a series of roads connecting the 15 provincial capitals of the region.
Iga (created in 680 from Ise)
western Mie (Iga and Nabari cities)
Ise
central/northern/southern Mie
Shima (created at the beginning of the 8th century from Ise)
eastern Mie (Toba and Shima cities)
Owari
western Aichi (around Nagoya)
Mikawa
eastern Aichi (around Toyohashi)
Tōtōmi
western Shizuoka (around Iwata)
Suruga
central Shizuoka (around Shizuoka city)
Izu (created 680 from Suruga)
eastern Shizuoka (Izu Peninsula)
Tokyo (Izu Islands)
Kai
entire Yamanashi
Sagami
southwestern Kanagawa (most)
Musashi (transferred in 771 from Tōsandō)
northeastern Kanagawa (Yokohama and Kawasaki cities)
entire Tokyo (most)
entire Saitama (most)
western Chiba
Awa (created in 718 from Kazusa, then rejoined back in 741, later re-split in 781)
southern Chiba
Kazusa (broke off from Fusa in the 7th century)
central Chiba
Shimōsa (broke off from Fusa in the 7th century)
northern Chiba
southeastern Ibaraki (around Kashima)
part of Saitama (west portion of the Edogawa River)
Hitachi
central/northeastern Ibaraki

Tōsandō
The Tōsandō is a region which straddles the central mountains of northern Honshū.  The descriptive name also refers to a series of roads connecting the provincial capitals.  Tōsandō included Musashi Province after 711.
Ōmi
entire Shiga
Mino
southern Gifu
Hida
northern Gifu (around Takayama)
Shinano
entire Nagano (northern Nagano without Suwa)
Suwa (created in 721 from Shinano, later rejoined back in 731)
southern Nagano (Ina (Kamiina and Shimoina) and Suwa Districts)
Kōzuke (broke off from Kenu during the 4th century)
entire Gunma
Shimotsuke (broke off from Kenu during the 4th century)
entire Tochigi
Uzen (broke off from Dewa during the Meiji Restoration in 1868)
southeastern Yamagata (most)
Ugo (broke off from Dewa during the Meiji Restoration in 1868)
southwestern Akita (most)
northwestern Yamagata (Akumi District)
Mutsu (created in the 7th century from Hitachi)
entire Aomori
northwestern Iwate
Iwashiro (created during the Meiji Restoration in 1868 from Mutsu)
western/central Fukushima
Iwaki (created during the Meiji Restoration in 1868 from Mutsu)
eastern Fukushima
southwestern Miyagi (Igu, Katta and Watari Districts)
Rikuchū (created during the Meiji Restoration in 1868 from Mutsu)
northeastern Akita (Kazuno city and Kosaka town)
central/northeastern/southwestern Iwate (most)
northeastern Miyagi
Rikuzen (created during the Meiji Restoration in 1868 from Mutsu)
southeastern Iwate (Kesen District, Rikuzentakata Ōfunato and Kamaishi cities)
central/northwestern/southeastern Miyagi (most)

Hokurikudō
Wakasa
southern/western Fukui
Echizen (broke off from Koshi during the end of the 7th century)
northern/eastern Fukui
Kaga (created in 823 from Echizen)
southern/western Ishikawa
Noto (created in 718 from Echizen, then occupied in 741 by Etchū, later re-split in 757 from Etchū)
northern/eastern Ishikawa
Etchū (broke off from Koshi during the end of the 7th century)
entire Toyama
Echigo (broke off from Koshi during the end of the 7th century)
entire Niigata (most)
Sado (occupied in 743 by Echigo, later re-split in 752)
Sado city, Niigata

San'indō
Tanba
central/northeastern Hyōgo
central Kyoto
Tango (created in 713 from Tamba)
northern Kyoto
Tajima
northern/northwestern Hyōgo
Inaba
eastern Tottori
Hōki
western Tottori
Izumo
eastern Shimane
Iwami
western Shimane
Oki
Oki District, Shimane

San'yōdō
Harima
southern/southwestern Hyōgo
Mimasaka (created in 713 from Bizen)
northeastern Okayama
Bizen (broke off from Kibi during the 2nd half of the 7th century)
southeastern Okayama
Bitchū (broke off from Kibi during the 2nd half of the 7th century)
western Okayama
Bingo (broke off from Kibi during the 2nd half of the 7th century)
eastern Hiroshima
Aki
western Hiroshima
Suō
eastern Yamaguchi
Nagato
western Yamaguchi

Nankaidō
Kii
entire Wakayama
southern Mie
Awaji
Awaji city, Hyōgo
Awa
entire Tokushima
Sanuki
entire Kagawa
Iyo
entire Ehime
Tosa
entire Kōchi

Saikaidō
Buzen (broke off from Toyo at the end of the 7th century)
northeastern Fukuoka Prefecture
northwestern Ōita Prefecture
Bungo (broke off from Toyo at the end of the 7th century)
central/southeastern Ōita Prefecture (most)
Chikuzen (broke off from Tsukushi no later than the end of the 7th century)
central/northwestern Fukuoka Prefecture (most)
Chikugo (broke off from Tsukushi no later than the end of the 7th century)
southern Fukuoka Prefecture
Hizen (broke off from Hi no later than the end of the 7th century)
entire Nagasaki (most)
entire Saga
Higo (broke off from Hi no later than the end of the 7th century)
Kumamoto
Hyūga
Miyazaki
Ōsumi (created in 702 from Hyūga)
eastern Kagoshima
Tane (created in 702 from Hyūga, later occupied in 824 by Ōsumi)
Kagoshima (Tanegashima and Yakushima Islands)
Satsuma　(created in 702 from Hyūga)
western Kagoshima
Iki (officially Iki-shima)
Iki city, Nagasaki
Tsushima (officially Tsushima-jima''')
Tsushima city, Nagasaki

Hokkaidō
Oshima
southern Oshima Subprefecture
southern Hiyama Subprefecture
Shiribeshi
most of Shiribeshi Subprefecture (excluding Abuta District)
northern Hiyama Subprefecture
Iburi
entire Iburi Subprefecture
Yamakoshi District, in Oshima Subprefecture
Abuta District, in Shiribeshi Subprefecture
Chitose and Eniwa cities, in Ishikari Subprefecture
Shimukappu village, Kamikawa Subprefecture
Ishikari
most of Ishikari Subprefecture (excluding Chitose and Eniwa cities)
entire Sorachi Subprefecture
southern Kamikawa Subprefecture (excluding Shimukappu village)
Teshio
entire Rumoi Subprefecture
northern Kamikawa Subprefecture
Kitami
entire Sōya Subprefecture
most of Abashiri Subprefecture (excluding part of Abashiri District)
Hidaka
entire Hidaka Subprefecture
Tokachi
entire Tokachi Subprefecture
Kushiro
entire Kushiro Subprefecture
part of Abashiri District, in Abashiri Subprefecture
Nemuro
entire Nemuro Subprefecture
Chishima (the islands of Kunashiri and Etorofu, later included Shikotan and the Kuril Islands)

Notes

References
 Nussbaum, Louis-Frédéric and Käthe Roth. (2005).  Japan encyclopedia. Cambridge: Harvard University Press. ;  OCLC 58053128
 Titsingh, Isaac. (1834).  Annales des empereurs du Japon (Nihon Ōdai Ichiran'').  Paris: Royal Asiatic Society, Oriental Translation Fund of Great Britain and Ireland. OCLC 5850691

Geographic history of Japan
Comparisons
Subdivisions of Japan